Georg Jellinek (16 June 1851 – 12 January 1911) was a German public lawyer and was considered to be "the exponent of public law in Austria“.

Life
From 1867, Jellinek studied law, history of art and philosophy at the University of Vienna. He also studied philosophy, history and law in Heidelberg and Leipzig up until 1872. He was the son of Adolf Jellinek, a famous preacher in Vienna's Jewish community. In 1872 he completed his Dr. phil. thesis in Leipzig (The Socio-Ethical Meaning of Justice, Injustice and Punishment) and in 1874 also his Dr. jur. in Vienna.

In 1879 he qualified as a professor at the University of Vienna. Jellinek was later visiting professor of legal philosophy in Vienna, in 1881 he was named a member of the commission for state exams and one year later he published his seminal work, The Theory of the Unifications of States (1882). In 1883 he was given the prestigious title of Professor of Public Law at the University of Vienna. In 1889 he was duly given a professorship in Basel and left the academic service of Austria-Hungary. From 1891 he was Ordinarius for general Public Law and International Law at the University of Heidelberg. In 1900 he compiled his main work, General Theory of the State.

He was married to Camilla Jellinek, née Wertheim (1860–1940), who was persuaded to join the Women's Movement by Marianne Weber in 1900 and became famous there especially for her work with providing women with legal aid and the production of draft reforms of the criminal law. The couple had six children, born between 1884 and 1896, of which just four survived childhoodamong them son Walter, who also became a law professor and edited a final, posthumous edition of General Theory of the State;  daughter Dora, who survived the Theresienstadt concentration camp;  and youngest son, Otto, who died in 1943 as a result of abuse at the hands of the Gestapo.

Jellinek is best known for his essay The Declaration of the Rights of Man and the Citizen (1895), which argues for a universal theory of rights, as opposed to the culturally and nationally specific arguments then in vogue (particularly that of Émile Boutmy).  Jellinek argued that the French Revolution, which was the focal point of 19th-century political theory, should not be thought of as arising from a purely French tradition (namely the tradition stemming from Jean-Jacques Rousseau) but as a close analogue of revolutionary movements and ideas in England and the United States.

Career 

Jellinek studied law in 1867 in Vienna at the Alma Mater Rudolphina along with art history and philosophy. In addition he continued studies until 1872 in philosophy, history and law at the Heidelberg University in Heidelberg and at the Alma Mater Lipsiensis. Jellinek attended Leipzig in 1872 writing a dissertation on The Worldviews of Leibnitz and Schopenhauer and received his Dr. phil. In 1874, he also received the Dr. jur.

Jellinek followed this in 1879 with his Habilitation at the University of Vienna. Jellinek then became a lecturer in the philosophy of law in Vienna, and in 1881 he was appointed a member of the State Examination Commission. In the following year, Jellinek published one of his seminal works titled 'The doctrine of Federated States' (1882). In 1883 he was appointed extraordinary professor of Constitutional Law in Vienna. In 1889 he became a full professor in Basel and retired from his academic position in Austria-Hungary. In 1891 Jellinek became a Professor of law at the University of Heidelberg and wrote, in 1900, his magnum opus, the General Theory of State. In 1907 he became the first Jewish Rector of Heidelberg University.

Writings 
The majority of Jellinek's writings remain untranslated out of the original German language.
 Die Weltanschauungen Leibnitz’ und Schopenhauer’s: Ihre Gründe und ihre Berechtigung. Eine Studie über Optimismus und Pessimismus. Hölder, Wien 1872 (phil. Dissertation, Universität Leipzig; Digitalisat).
 Die Lehre von den Staatenverbindungen. Haering, Berlin 1882 (Digitalisat).
 Die socialethische Bedeutung von Recht, Unrecht und Strafe. Hölder, Wien 1878 (Digitalisat).
 Die rechtliche Natur der Staatenverträge: Ein Beitrag zur juristischen Construction des Völkerrechts. Hölder, Wien 1880 (Digitalisat).
 Österreich-Ungarn und Rumänien in der Donaufrage: Eine völkerrechtliche Untersuchung. Hölder, Wien 1884 (Digitalisat).
 Gesetz und Verordnung: Staatsrechtliche Untersuchungen auf rechtsgeschichtlicher und rechtsvergleichender Grundlage. Mohr, Freiburg im Breisgau 1887 ( Digitalisat).
 System der subjektiven öffentlichen Rechte. Mohr, Freiburg im Breisgau 1892 (Digitalisat).
 Allgemeine Staatslehre (= Recht des modernen Staates. Bd. 1). Berlin 1900; 2. Auflage 1905 (Digitalisat); 3. Auflage 1914 (Digitalisat).

Literature 
 Andreas Anter (Hrsg.): Die normative Kraft des Faktischen: das Staatsverständnis Georg Jellineks. Nomos-Verlag, Baden-Baden 2004, .
 
 Camilla Jellinek: Georg Jellinek. Ein Lebensbild. In: Georg Jellinek, Ausgewählte Schriften und Reden, Bd. 1, Neudruck Aalen 1970, S. 5–140.
 Christian Keller: Victor Ehrenberg und Georg Jellinek. Briefwechsel 1872–1911, Frankfurt am Main 2005, .
 Klaus Kempter: Die Jellineks 1820–1955. Eine familienbiographische Studie zum deutschjüdischen Bildungsbürgertum. Düsseldorf 1998.
 Jens Kersten: Georg Jellinek und die klassische Staatslehre. Verlag Mohr-Siebeck, Tübingen 2000, .
 Realino Marra: La religione dei diritti. Durkheim – Jellinek – Weber. Giappichelli, Turin 2006, .
 Stanley L. Paulson (Hrsg.): Georg Jellinek: Beiträge zu Leben und Werk. Verlag Mohr-Siebeck, Tübingen 2000, .

References

Further reading

External links 
The majority of weblinks for Jellinek are in his native German language as are his major writings.

 
 
 
 Familienpapiere Jellinek 1850–1960 
 Dr. Matthias Hartwig: Der Staat als Gegenstand des Staatsrechts Kurzer Text beim Max-Planck-Institut für ausländisches öffentliches Recht und Völkerrecht, Heidelberg, Online-Resource, zur Drei-Elementen-Lehre
 Jens Kersten: Georg Jellinek. In: Enzyklopädie zur Rechtsphilosophie, im Auftrag der Deutschen Sektion der Internationalen Vereinigung für Rechts- und Sozialphilosophie (IVR), hrsg. von Michael Anderheiden (u. a.)

German male writers
German philosophers
19th-century German Jews
Austrian people of Czech-Jewish descent
Jewish philosophers
Political philosophers
Writers from Leipzig
People from the Kingdom of Saxony
1851 births
1911 deaths
Jurists from Saxony